The Cathedral of Saint James (or Saints Jacobs Armenian Cathedral) is a 12th-century Armenian church in the Armenian Quarter of Jerusalem, near the quarter's entry Zion Gate. The cathedral is dedicated to two of the Twelve Apostles of Jesus: James, son of Zebedee (James the Greater) and James the brother of Jesus (James the Just). It is located near the Church of the Holy Archangels.

It is the principal church of the Armenian Patriarchate of Jerusalem, also known as the Armenian Patriarchate of Saint James.

In 1162, it was described as complete by John of Würzburg which Nurith Kenaan-Kedar uses to argue that it was built during the reign of Melisende, Queen of Jerusalem.

Ornamentation

The ceiling is decorated hanging ceramic eggs made in Kütahya. More ceramics from Kütahya appear in the form of tiles in the Chapel of Etchmiadzin. Originally destined for a 1719 attempt to repair the Church of the Holy Sepulchre they ended up in the Cathedral of Saint James after the plan fell through.

Gallery

See also 
 List of Armenian Patriarchs of Jerusalem
 Hethum II, King of Armenia

References

Bibliography
 Armenian Patriarchate: official website

Further reading 

 (Pringle, 2007, pp. 168-182)

External links 
 The website of the Armenian Patriarchate of Jerusalem 

Oriental Orthodox congregations established in the 12th century
Armenian Apostolic cathedrals in Israel
Armenian Apostolic cathedrals in the State of Palestine
Armenian Apostolic churches in Jerusalem
Cathedrals in Jerusalem
Church buildings with domes
Tombs of apostles
Cathedrals in the State of Palestine